Bayramiç can refer to:

 Bayramiç
 Bayramiç, Gelibolu
 Bayramiç, Gönen